ACTV Japan, officially Access Television Limited (also referred to as ACTV), is a Japanese video and television production company based in Shibuya, Tokyo. The company was founded by Yoshio Numai in 2005 for the development and production of original TV and movie programming in Japan. It developed and produced the entertainment news show Fox Backstage Pass for Fox International Channels. They currently produce the documentary movie "Fishmans".

Filmography

Current
 Fishmans (Documentary movie)

Former programmes
 FOX Backstage Pass (for Fox International Channels)
 Black Life in Japan
The Biography

References

External links 
 

Mass media companies based in Tokyo
Entertainment companies of Japan
Video production companies